Dean Nicolle  (born 1974), is an Australian botanist, arborist and ecologist. He is widely recognised as the leading authority on the genus Eucalyptus.

Nicolle was born in Adelaide, South Australia in 1974 and developed an interest in Eucalyptus trees as a young man. After completing a Bachelor of Science at Adelaide University, he went on to complete his PhD in 2008 on mallee trees at Flinders University.

Shortly afterwards Nicolle created the Currency Creek Arboretum, on a  site in the Fleurieu region in South Australia. He is currently the director and head of research at the arboretum and has cultivated over 900 species and subspecies of Eucalyptus.

References

20th-century Australian botanists
Australian taxonomists
1974 births
Botanists active in Australia
Flinders University alumni
University of Adelaide alumni
21st-century Australian botanists
Living people